James Chaine (1841 – 4 May 1885) was an Irish shipping businessman and a Conservative Party politician from County Antrim in Ulster.

The son of James Chaine of Ballycraigy and his wife, Maria (née Whittle), from Antrim, he was educated in Blackheath. In 1863, he married Henrietta Creery from Newcastle, County Down.

Chaine was influential in developing the cross-channel links between Larne and Stranraer, Scotland. He was the director of the Larne and Stanraer Boat Company, and was the key figure behind the building of the Port and Harbour of Larne. He promoted and financed construction of railroad lines from Larne to Ballyclare and from Larne to Ballymena (the Ballymena and Larne Railway).

He was elected at the 1874 general election as the Member of Parliament (MP) for Antrim, and held the seat until his death at the age of 43 in May 1885. 

Chaine, James Porter Corry and William Ewart formed a minority of Irish MPs from "the world of the big business" while the majority were either landowners or descendants of the landed families. Chaine himself became a major landowner by the purchase of a £64,000 estate in Carncastle followed by a £22,000 estate in Killead.

Death
He died after catching a chill, which developed into pneumonia. His estate was valued at £62,681. He was buried, in an upright position, overlooking Larne Lough, near Sandy Point. The Chaine Memorial, a replica Irish round tower, was built in Larne in 1888 to commemorate him.

Notes

References
 
 Campbell, Fergus (2009). The Irish Establishment 1879-1914. Oxford University Press. .
 
 Thomson, Frank (2001). The end of liberal Ulster: land agitation and land reform, 1868-1886. Ulster Historical Foundation. .

External links 
 

1841 births
1885 deaths
People from Larne
Members of the Parliament of the United Kingdom for County Antrim constituencies (1801–1922)
UK MPs 1874–1880
UK MPs 1880–1885
Irish Conservative Party MPs
Businesspeople in shipping
19th-century Irish businesspeople